The county constituency of Herefordshire, in the West Midlands of England bordering on Wales, was abolished when the county was divided for parliamentary purposes in 1885. It was a constituency of the House of Commons of the Parliament of England, then of the Parliament of Great Britain from 1707 to 1800 and of the Parliament of the United Kingdom from 1801 to 1885.

The undivided county was represented from 1290 by two Knights of the Shire until 1832 and three thereafter. After the county was split two new county constituencies were created, the North division or Leominster and the South division or Ross.

Boundaries
The constituency consisted of the historic county of Herefordshire. Although Herefordshire contained a number of parliamentary boroughs, each of which elected one or two MPs in its own right for parts of the period when Herefordshire was a constituency, these areas were not excluded from the county constituency. Owning freehold property of the required value, within such boroughs, could confer a vote at the county election. From 1832 only non-resident owners of forty-shilling freeholds, situated in borough seats, could qualify for a county vote on the basis of that property.

Members of Parliament

1290–1604

Constituency created (1290)

1604–1832
As there were sometimes significant gaps between Parliaments, the dates of first assembly and dissolution are given for those up to 1640. Where the name of the member has not yet been ascertained or is not recorded in a surviving document, the entry unknown is entered in the table.

1832–1885

Election results

Elections in the 1830s

Elections in the 1840s

Elections in the 1850s
Bailey's death caused a by-election.

 

 
 

Booker-Blakemore's death caused a by-election.

Elections in the 1860s

Elections in the 1870s

Elections in the 1880s

See also
List of former United Kingdom Parliament constituencies
Unreformed House of Commons

References
Notes

Cobbett's Parliamentary history of England, from the Norman Conquest in 1066 to the year 1803 (London: Thomas Hansard, 1808) 
 The House of Commons 1690–1715, by Eveline Cruickshanks, Stuart Handley and D.W. Hayton (Cambridge University Press 2002)
 The Parliaments of England by Henry Stooks Smith (1st edition published in three volumes 1844–50), second edition edited (in one volume) by F.W.S. Craig (Political Reference Publications 1973))
Calendar of Close Rolls, Richard II, Volume 1, by H.C. Maxwell Lyte (editor). (London: 1914). British History Online , 16 November 1378, 27 May 1379, 25 Feb 1382, 22 May 1382, and 26 November 1383.
Calendar of Fine Rolls, Henry VI, Volume 16, 1430–1437. (London:1936). Page 281, 3 January 1436 (membrane 11)
Calendar of Fine Rolls, Henry VI, Volume 17, 1437–1445. (London: 1936). Page 148, 24 April 1440 (membrane 12)

Constituencies of the Parliament of the United Kingdom established in 1290
Constituencies of the Parliament of the United Kingdom disestablished in 1885
Parliamentary constituencies in Herefordshire (historic)